Ron Randleman (born December 17, 1941) is a former American football coach. He served as head coach at Sam Houston State University in Huntsville, Texas from 1982 to 2004. Randleman retired after the 2004 season as the winningest head coach in the history of the Sam Houston State Bearkats football program.

A native of Carlisle, Iowa, Randleman quarterbacked at William Penn College, where he graduated in 1964. After a short stint as head coach at Twin Cedars High School in Bussey, Iowa, Randleman returned to his alma mater as offensive coordinator. In 1969, he was promoted to head coach. He added the title of athletic director in 1974. He left the school after seven seasons with an overall record of 51–17–1, to coach at Pittsburg State University in Pittsburg, Kansas.

At Pittsburg State, Randleman turned the football program around, compiling a 36–25–2 record in six seasons. He directed the Gorillas to three Central States Conference championships and a trip to the NAIA national finals in 1981. He received coach of the year honors from his conference and his NAIA district three times. In 1981, he was named NAIA National Coach of the Year and NAIA District Six Coach of the Year. On February 5, 1982, Randleman left Pittsburg State to take over at Sam Houston State.

At the time Randleman arrived, the Sam Houston State had gone 25–67 in their last eight seasons. Randleman compiled a 131–125–3 record at Sam Houston State, while winning Conference Coach of the Year honors four times.

Head coaching record

See also
 List of college football coaches with 200 wins

References

1941 births
Living people
American football quarterbacks
Pittsburg State Gorillas football coaches
Sam Houston Bearkats athletic directors
Sam Houston Bearkats football coaches
William Penn Statesmen football coaches
William Penn Statesmen football players
High school football coaches in Iowa